Mansour Abbas (born 22 April 1974) is an Israeli Arab politician. He is currently the leader of the United Arab List and represents the party in the Knesset. He was appointed as the chair of Special Committee on Arab Society Affairs in the Knesset on 27 April 2021.

Early life and education
Abbas was born in the town of Maghar; his parents were farmers, and he had 10 siblings. He began delivering sermons at the Peace Mosque in Maghar at the age of 17. He attended the Hebrew University of Jerusalem to study dentistry, where he was elected chair of the Arab Students Committee between 1997 and 1998. While at university he met Abdullah Nimar Darwish, the founder of the Islamic Movement. He also studied political science at the University of Haifa.

Career
Abbas is a qualified dentist.

In 2007 Abbas became Secretary General of the United Arab List, and in 2010 he was elected Deputy Chairman of the Southern Branch of the Islamic Movement.

The United Arab List and Balad ran a joint list for the April 2019 Knesset elections, with Abbas as the top candidate. He was subsequently elected to the Knesset as the alliance won four seats. Abbas aroused controversy when he spoke in support of conversion therapy to LGBTQ+ youth in an interview with Walla News. He was condemned by other Joint List politicians. Further divisiveness was caused by Abbas's apparent attempt to improve ties with Israeli Prime Minister Benjamin Netanyahu and the right-wing Likud. He gave an interview with the right-wing pro-Netanyahu Channel 20 Network, where he advocated working with Zionist parties in order to secure the funds and reforms needed for the benefit of Arab Israeli society.

On 21 April 2020, Abbas delivered a historic speech on the Holocaust in the Knesset in which he spoke of the suffering of the Jewish people at the hands of the Nazis. Abbas stated: "As a religious Palestinian Muslim Arab, who was raised on the legacy of Sheikh Abdullah Nimr Darwish who founded the Islamic Movement, I have empathy for the pain and suffering over the years of Holocaust survivors and the families of the murdered." He added, "I stand here to show solidarity with the Jewish people here and forever."

Abbas joined the rest of the Joint List in voting against the Abraham Accords. He described his vote as a protest against the lack of a peace treaty with the Palestinians, adding, "If there will be a real agreement with the Palestinians, there will be real agreements with 55 Muslim countries. But what truly matters is that we are Israelis, and our actions are not supposed to be influenced by whether there is peace with Bahrain."

In January 2021, in the buildup to the 2021 elections, the United Arab List split from the Joint List. Analysts attributed the split to a larger, more fundamental disagreement about whether to engage fully with Israeli politics as a means to improve quality of life for Arab Israeli citizens, which Abbas advocates, or to reject full engagement with domestic Israeli politics in order to focus on the larger Israeli-Palestinian conflict. Abbas attributed this position to the influence of his mentor, Sheikh Abdullah, and described Abdullah's funeral as a philosophical turning point for him.

During the 2021 Israeli-Palestinian crisis Abbas condemned the burning of several synagogues in Lod by rioters, appealing to Muslim values and respect for the rule of law and vowing to help rebuild them; his actions earned him both praise from Jewish leaders and politicians, and anger from Muslim leaders, including calls to resign.

According to the by-laws of the party, limiting MKs to three terms, Abbas was ineligible to run again for office in the 2021 elections. Abbas stated "I have to respect the institutions of Ra'am, if the bylaws are not changed, even though they didn't anticipate four elections in two years when they made the rules." However, he ran in the election as party leader and the United Arab List won four seats.

Coalition government 
On 2 June 2021, after holding negotiations with Israeli opposition figures Yair Lapid and Naftali Bennett, Abbas renewed his commitment to backing a non-Netanyahu government after signing a coalition agreement with Lapid, thereby forming the thirty-sixth government of Israel. A photograph of Abbas signing the agreement, which made Ra'am the first independent Arab party to be part of a governing coalition, was widely circulated; after signing it, Bennett praised Abbas as a "courageous" leader. The agreement included pledges to spend approximately US$16 billion to improve infrastructure and reduce crime in Arab towns, to protect homes built without permits in Arab villages, and to recognize four Bedouin towns in the Negev desert.

On 28 October 2021 the Israeli cabinet approved a plan to spend an US$9.4 billion to improve employment opportunities and health services for Israeli Arabs and improve housing, technology, and infrastructure in Arab areas; it included a further US$1 billion to address high crime rates in Arab areas. Abbas was widely credited with accomplishing "historic step" forward for Arab Israelis in securing this unprecedented amount of funding. The plan was signed into law when the budget passed on 4 November.

Under Abbas's direction the coalition government has recognized several Bedouin villages and has connected tens of thousands of previously-illegal homes to the electrical grid.

On 9 November 2021 Abbas met with King Abdullah II of Jordan, the first occasion where the king has met an Arab party leader who is a sitting member of the Israeli government; the two discussed the peace process and reiterated their support for a two-state solution.

On 21 December 2021 Abbas said that Israel was born as a Jewish state and will remain so, provoking outrage from members of other Arab parties.

On 10 February 2022 Abbas rejected Amnesty International's charge that Israel is an apartheid state, saying of Israel: "I would not call it apartheid."

Ideology and views
Abbas has been stated to be conservative and socially conservative and has opposed pro-LGBT legislation. He has also spoken out in support of conversion therapy for LGBT people. He is frequently referred to as an Islamist. He has lambasted political parties on the Israeli left, saying, "What have I to do with the left? … in religious matters, I'm right-wing" and said that he has more in common with conservative Jewish ultra-Orthodox parties than with socially liberal parties. 

Abbas drew criticism from Palestinians for publicly accepting Israel as a de facto Jewish state and stating that it does not practice apartheid. His decision to do so during comments he made at a business conference caused an uproar in the Arab public. Abbas was also criticised for calling Palestinian political prisoners in Israeli prisons "terrorists".

Personal life
Abbas is married with three children and lives in Maghar; his wife, Yakoot, is a high school English teacher.

Abbas serves as an imam at a mosque near Tiberias.

References

External links

 

1974 births
Living people
Arab members of the Knesset
Deputy ministers of Israel
Deputy Speakers of the Knesset
Hebrew University-Hadassah Faculty of Dental Medicine alumni
Islamic Movement in Israel politicians
Islamists
Israeli dentists
Israeli Muslims
Members of the 21st Knesset (2019)
Members of the 22nd Knesset (2019–2020)
Members of the 23rd Knesset (2020–2021)
Members of the 24th Knesset (2021–2022)
Members of the 25th Knesset (2022–)
People from Maghar
United Arab List leaders
University of Haifa alumni